Higginsia is a genus of sea sponges belonging to the order Axinellida.

It is named for Henry Higgins (1814–1893), a British botanist and clergyman.

Species
The following species are recognised in the genus Higginsia:
 Higginsia arborea (Keller, 1891)
 Higginsia bidentifera (Ridley & Dendy, 1886)
 Higginsia ciccaresei Pansini & Pesce, 1998
 Higginsia coralloides Higgin, 1877
 Higginsia higgini Dendy, 1922
 Higginsia higginissima Dickinson, 1945
 Higginsia kenyensis Pulitzer-Finali, 1993
 Higginsia lamella Pulitzer-Finali, 1993
 Higginsia massalis Carter, 1885
 Higginsia mediterranea Pulitzer-Finali, 1978
 Higginsia mixta (Hentschel, 1912)
 Higginsia natalensis Carter, 1885
 Higginsia palmata Pulitzer-Finali, 1996
 Higginsia petrosioides Dendy, 1922
 Higginsia pulcherrima Pulitzer-Finali, 1993
 Higginsia pumila (Keller, 1889)
 Higginsia pyriformis Brøndsted, 1916
 Higginsia robusta Burton, 1959
 Higginsia scabra Whitelegge, 1907
 Higginsia strigilata (Lamarck, 1814)
 Higginsia tanekea Hooper & Lévi, 1993
 Higginsia tethyoides Lévi, 1960
 Higginsia thielei Topsent, 1898

References

Halichondrida